During the Bourbon Restoration (1814–1830) and the July Monarchy (1830–1848), the Doctrinals were a group of French royalists who hoped to reconcile the monarchy with the French Revolution and power with liberty. Headed by Royer-Collard, these liberal royalists were in favor of a constitutional monarchy, but with a heavily restricted census suffrage—Louis XVIII, who had been restored to the throne, had granted a Charter to the French with a Chamber of Peers and a Chamber of Deputies elected under tight electoral laws (only around 100,000 Frenchmen had at the time the right to vote). The Doctrinaires were a centrist, as well as a conservative-liberal group, but at that time, liberal was considered to be the mainstream political left, so the group was considered a centre-left group.

During the July Monarchy, they were an intellectual and political group within the Resistance Party. Led by the Duke of Broglie and François Guizot, the Doctrinaires held powerful posts throughout the reign of Louis-Philippe. Broglie (1835–1836) and Guizot (1847–1848) were both Prime Ministers of France, although Guizot and the Doctrinaires dominated the political scenery during the premiership of Marshal Jean-de-Dieu Soult (1840–1847).

History and characteristics

Origins 
The Doctrinaires first obtained in 1816 the co-operation of Louis XVIII, who had been frightened by the violence of the Ultra-royalists in the Chambre introuvable of 1815. However, the Ultras quickly came back to government, headed by the comte de Villèle. The Doctrinaires were then in the opposition, although they remained quite close to the government, especially to Decazes who assumed some governmental offices. The Doctrinaires were opposed on their left by republicans and liberals, and on their right by the Ultras.

Finally, the Doctrinaires were destroyed by Charles X, the reactionary successor of his brother Louis XVIII. Charles took the ultra prince de Polignac as his minister. This nomination in part caused the 1830 July Revolution, during which the Doctrinaires became absorbed in the Orléanists, from whom they had never been separated on any ground of principle. According to René Rémond's famous classification of the various right-wing families in France, the Orléanists became the second right-wing tradition to emerge after the Legitimists, a term used to refer to the Ultras after the July Revolution.

Doctrinaires, a pejorative word quickly reappropriated 
As has often been the case with party designations, the name was at first given in derision and by an enemy. In 1816, the Nain jaune réfugié, a French paper, published at Brussels by Bonapartist and liberal exiles, began to speak of Royer-Collard as the doctrinaire and also as le Pierre Royer-Collard de la doctrine chrétienne, a name which came from Royer-Collard's studies under the Prêtres de la doctrine chrétienne, a French religious order founded in 1592 by César de Bus and popularly known as the doctrinaires.

The choice of a nickname for Royer-Collard does credit to the journalistic insight of the contributors to the Nain jaune réfugié, for he was emphatically a man who made it his business to preach a doctrine and an orthodoxy. The term quickly became popular and was extended to Royer-Collard's colleagues, who came from different horizons. The duc de Richelieu and Hercule de Serre had been royalist émigrés during the revolutionary and imperial epoch.

Nationalize the monarchy and royalize France 
Royer-Collard himself, Jean Maximilien Lamarque and Maine de Biran had sat in the revolutionary Assemblies. Pasquier, the comte de Beugnot, the baron de Barante, Georges Cuvier, Mounier, Guizot and Decazes had been imperial officials, but they were closely united by political principle and also by a certain similarity of method. Some of them, notably Guizot and Maine de Biran, were theorists and commentators on the principles of government. The baron de Barante was an eminent man of letters. All were noted for the doctrinal coherence of their principles and the dialectical rigidity of their arguments. The object of the party as defined by the future duc Decazes was to "nationalize the monarchy and to royalize France". The king, who had been king of France during the Ancien Régime, ultimately became king of the French under the July Monarchy. This illustrated the change from the divine right of kings to national sovereignty as sovereignty was not derived from God anymore, but from the people.

The means by which they hoped to attain this end were a loyal application of the Charter granted by Louis XVIII and the steady co-operation of the king with themselves to defeat the Ultra-royalists, a group of counterrevolutionaries who aimed at the complete undoing of the political and social work of the French Revolution. The Doctrinaires were ready to allow the king a large discretion in the choice of his ministers and the direction of national policy. They refused the principle of parliamentary responsibility, that is to allow that ministers should be removed in obedience to a hostile vote in the chamber.

Their ideal in fact was a combination of a king who frankly accepted the results of the Revolution and who governed in a liberal spirit, with the advice of a chamber elected by a very limited constituency in which men of property and education formed, if not the wholes at least the very great majority of the voters. This king was not to be found until Louis-Philippe's reign during the July Monarchy. Guizot set forth the Doctrinaires' ideology in his 1816 treatise Du gouvernement représentatif et de l'état actuel de la France. The chief organs of the party in the press were the Indépendant (renamed the Constitutionnel in 1817) and the Journal des Débats. The Doctrinaires were chiefly supported by ex officials of the empire who believed in the necessity for monarchical government, but had a lively memory of Napoleon's authoritative rule and a no less lively hatred of the Ancien Régime — merchants, manufacturers and members of the liberal professions, particularly the lawyers.

English terminology 
The word doctrinaire has become naturalized in English terminology as applied in a slightly contemptuous sense to a theorist as distinguished from a practical man of affairs.

Prominent members 
 The Baron of Barante
 Jacques Claude Beugnot
 Louis Becquey
 Maine de Biran
 The Duke of Broglie
 Pierre Paul Royer-Collard
 Benjamin Constant
 Victor Cousin
 Georges Cuvier
 Élie Decazes
 The Marquis Dessolles
 Tanneguy Duchâtel
 François Guizot
 Prosper Duvergier de Hauranne
 Hippolyte François Jaubert
 Camille Jordan
 Théodore Simon Jouffroy
 The Marquis of Lafayette
 Jean Maximilien Lamarque
 Étienne-Denis Pasquier
 The Count of Rémusat
 The Duke of Richelieu
 Hercule de Serre
 Charles Maurice de Talleyrand
 Abel-François Villemain

Electoral results

See also 
 Modification of political parties under the Restoration

References

Further reading 
 Craiutu, Aurelian. Liberalism under Siege: The Political Thought of the French Doctrinaires. Lexington Books, 2003.
 Rosanvallon, Pierre. Le Moment Guizot. Gallimard, 1985.
 Siedentop, Larry. "Two Liberal Traditions". The Idea of Freedom: Essays in Honour of Isaiah Berlin. Oxford University Press, 1979.
 Starzinger, Vincent E. The Politics of the Center: The Juste Milieu in Theory and Practice, France and England, 1815-1848. Transaction Publishers, 1991.

 
Bourbon Restoration
Classical liberal parties
Conservative liberal parties
Conservative liberalism
Centre-left parties in Europe
Centrist parties in France
Orléanist parties
Political parties of the Bourbon Restoration